Player is a weekly digitally driven music and news show presented by MTV Base Africa VJ Sizwe Dhlomo. The show features international entertainment news and content with a Pan-African focus. In addition, the show regularly brings African viewers exclusive music videos, thus keeping viewers up to date with the latest in international music.

Look and Feel
The name of the show Player is a pun, centering on the host, Sizwe as well as a media player, the buttons of which are activated by Sizwe throughout the show. There are various elements within the show which are aimed at bringing the viewers closer to the host, as well as the use of user generated content to allow the viewer to express themselves on television.

Digital Interaction

My Mobie
My mobie is a segment in which viewers are shown a scene from a famous movie or music video and then encouraged to send video clips of their reenaction of the scene from video cameras or Mobile phones, which then get featured in that section of the show.

Competitions

Flash Frame
Flash Frame is a competition within the show. At any one split second during the show, a picture will flash on the screen. Viewers are invited to send Sizwe an email, telling him what the picture was, in order to put themselves in line to win a prize.

MTV